The Puducherry–Mangalore Central Express is an Express train belonging to Southern Railway zone that runs between  and  in India. It is currently being operated with 16857/16858 train numbers on a weekly basis.

Service

The 16857/Puducherry–Mangaluru Central Express has an average speed of 47 km/hr and covers 865 km in 18h 35m. The 16856/Mangaluru Central–Puducherry Weekly Express has an average speed of 50 km/hr and covers 865 km in 17h 10m.

Halts & Schedule
The train 16857 leaves Puducherry (Pondicherry – PDY ) at 16:35 on Saturday and reaches Mangaluru (Mangalore Central – MAQ) at 10:10 on Sunday. It returns as 16858 which leaves Mangaluru (Mangalore Central – MAQ) at 17:05 on Sunday and reaches Puducherry (Pondicherry – PDY) at 10:00 on Monday.

16858 MAQ–PDY EXPRESS (SUNDAY)

16857 PDY–MAQ EXPRESS (SATURDAY)

Coach composition

The train has standard ICF rakes with a max speed of 110 kmph. The train consists of 15 coaches:

 1 AC II Tier
 2 AC III Tier
 7 Sleeper coaches
 6 General Unreserved
 2 Seating cum Luggage Rake

Traction

Both trains are hauled by a Golden Rock Loco Shed-based WDP-4D diesel locomotive from Puducherry to Mangalore and vice versa.

Rake sharing

22604–22603–22606–22605 – Empty to PDY – 16855–16856–16857–16858 – Empty to VM and repeat. PM @VM and SM @ MAQ. Total 2 standard blue ICF rakes

Direction reversal

The train reverses its direction 2 times:

See also 

 Puducherry railway station
 Mangaluru Central railway station
 Puducherry–Mangalore Central Weekly Express

Notes

References

External links 

 16857/Puducherry–Mangaluru Central Weekly Express India Rail Info
 16858/Mangaluru Central–Puducherry Weekly Express India Rail Info

Transport in Puducherry
Transport in Mangalore
Express trains in India
Rail transport in Puducherry
Rail transport in Tamil Nadu
Rail transport in Kerala
Rail transport in Karnataka
Railway services introduced in 2010